Lankasoma, is a genus of millipedes of the family Lankasomatidae. It contains 5 described species, all are endemic to Sri Lanka.

Species
Lankasoma anderssoni 
Lankasoma brincki 
Lankasoma cederholmi 
Lankasoma oreites 
Lankasoma mahleri

References

Millipede genera
Chordeumatida